Roger Fernandes (born 21 November 2005) is a Bissau-Guinean professional footballer who plays as a winger for S.C. Braga in the Primeira Liga.

Professional career
Fernandes made his professional debut with Braga in the 2021 Supertaça Cândido de Oliveira, a 2–1 loss to Sporting CP on 31 July 2021. At 15 years 8 months and 12 days, Fernandes is the youngest ever participant in the Supertaça Cândido de Oliveira.

Personal life
Born in Guinea Bissau, Fernandes moved to Portugal at a young age.

References

External links
 

2005 births
Living people
Sportspeople from Bissau
Bissau-Guinean footballers
Portuguese footballers
Bissau-Guinean emigrants to Portugal
Association football wingers
S.C. Braga players
Primeira Liga players
Campeonato de Portugal (league) players